The men's 110 metres hurdling event at the 1960 Olympic Games took place between September 3 and September 5. Thirty-six athletes from 21 nations competed. The maximum number of athletes per nation had been set at 3 since the 1930 Olympic Congress. The event was won by Lee Calhoun of the United States, the first man to successfully defend Olympic gold in the 110 metres hurdles. It was the sixth of nine consecutive American victories, and the 12th overall gold medal for the United States in the 110 metres hurdles. It was also the fourth of four consecutive American podium sweeps, and the eighth overall sweep by the United States in the event.

Background

This was the 14th appearance of the event, which is one of 12 athletics events to have been held at every Summer Olympics. Three finalists from 1956 returned: gold medalist Lee Calhoun of the United States, fourth-place finisher Martin Lauer of the United Team of Germany, and fifth-place finisher Stanko Lorger of Yugoslavia. Calhoun was favored to win again, though Lauer was a serious contender; they shared the world record at 13.2 seconds. Lauer was the only serious threat to the American team sweeping the medals again.

Afghanistan, the British West Indies, Iraq, Kenya, Nigeria, Sudan, and Uganda each made their first appearance in the event. The United States made its 14th appearance, the only nation to have competed in the 110 metres hurdles in each Games to that point.

Competition format

For the first time, the competition expanded to four rounds. The first round consisted of four heats, with 6 or 7 hurdlers each (before a withdrawal left one heat with only 5). The top four hurdlers in each heat advanced to the quarterfinals. There were four quarterfinals of 6 hurdles each; the top three hurdlers in each quarterfinal heat advanced to the semifinals. The 12 semifinalists were divided into two semifinals of 6 hurdlers each; the top three hurdlers in each advanced to the 6-man final.

Records

These were the standing world and Olympic records (in seconds) prior to the 1960 Summer Olympics.

No new world or Olympic records were set during the competition. The following national records were established during the competition:

Schedule

All times are Central European Time (UTC+1)

Results

Round 1

The fastest four hurdlers in each of the six heats advanced to the quarterfinal round.

Heat 1

Heat 2

Heat 3

Heat 4

Heat 5

Heat 6

Quarterfinals

The fastest three hurdlers in each of the four heats advanced to the semifinal round.

Quarterfinal 1

Quarterfinal 2

Quarterfinal 3

Quarterfinal 4

Semifinals

The fastest three hurdlers in each of the two heats advanced to the final round.

Semifinal 1

Semifinal 2

Final

References

M
Sprint hurdles at the Olympics
Men's events at the 1960 Summer Olympics